This article contains information about the literary events and publications of 1571.

Events
October 7 – Naval Battle of Lepanto: Miguel de Cervantes's left arm is rendered useless; Venetian playwright Luigi Pasqualigo commands a galleon.
unknown dates
Michel de Montaigne retires from public life and isolates himself in the tower of the Château de Montaigne.
First printing in the Irish language, Aibidil Gaoidheilge agus Caiticiosma, a primer printed by John Kearney in Dublin.
Laurentian Library in Florence opens to scholars.
Edict of Gaillon in France places enforcement of censorship laws with the state Chancellor's office instead of the University of Paris.
A tidal wave affects parts of Lincolnshire, England. It would be the subject of Jean Ingelow's narrative poem "The High-Tide on the Coast of Lincolnshire" (c.1883).

New books

Prose
François de Belleforest – La Pyrénée (or La Pastorale amoureuse) (the first French "pastoral novel")
Bishop John Jewel – Second Book of Homilies
Alonso de Molina
Arte de la lengua mexicana y castellana
Vocabulario en lengua castellana y mexicana

Drama
Richard Edwards – Damon and Pythias

Poetry
See 1571 in poetry

Deaths
May 4 – Pierre Viret, Swiss theologian (born 1511)
May 29 – Joachim Mörlin, German Lutheran theologian (born 1514)
July 17 – Georg Fabricius, German poet and historian (born 1516)
November 24 – Jan Blahoslav, Czech poet and translator (born 1523)
December 28 – John Hales, English writer and administrator (born c. 1516)
Unknown dates
Lodovico Castelvetro, Italian literary critic (born c. 1505)
Bartolomeo Maranta, Italian literary theorist (born 1500)
Andrés de Olmos, Spanish grammarian (born c. 1485)

References

Years of the 16th century in literature